Ashley Rae Spillers is an American actress and comedian. She is best known for her film roles as Elizabeth in the 2013 comedy film Last Vegas (2013), Amy in the 2014 neo-noir thriller film Two Step (2014) and Olivia in the Netflix comedy film Father of the Year (2018).

Her television roles include Janice Swift in the HBO television series Vice Principals (2016–2017), Sydney Jones in the drama television series NCIS: Los Angeles (2017–2019), Emily in the television series Distance (2018), and Huggins in the comic science fiction web series Red vs. Blue (2018–2019).

Her voice roles include Didi Pickles in the 2021 revival animated series Rugrats and Jill in Muppet Babies.

Early life
Spillers was born in Houston, Texas. She grew up in Sugar Land and she didn't become involved in theatre until she was either 11 or 12 years old.

She became influenced by the works made by famous celebrities, such as Holly Hunter for Broadcast News, Frances McDormand for Fargo, Mississippi Burning and Miller's Crossing, Melanie Lynskey, Bill Paxton for Apollo 13, Tom Hanks for Forrest Gump, Dianne Wiest, Toni Collette, Tom Cruise for Top Gun, A Few Good Men and Mission: Impossible, Bruce Willis for Die Hard and Armageddon, Bette Midler for Hocus Pocus, Cuba Gooding Jr. for Jerry Maguire, Jerry Orbach for Law & Order and Diane Keaton.

She took children's acting classes in Houston at the Town & Country Playhouse with actress Barbara Lasater. In 2004, she graduated from Kempner High School.

Career
In 2009, she made her debut when she played the title character in the short film Adaline. In 2012, she played Nancy in her first leading role in the film Saturday Morning Mystery and voiced Sarah Steele in the video game Pirate101.

In 2013, she appeared as Tracy in the film Dear Sidewalk, and Elizabeth in the comedy film Last Vegas, featuring Michael Douglas, Robert De Niro, Kevin Kline and Morgan Freeman. In 2014, Spillers played Amy in the thriller film Two Step and Julie in the film Arlo and Julie.

She made guest appearances on television shows, including The Middle, Driving Arizona, American Woman and Splitting Up Together.

From 2016 to 2017, she played Janice Swift in the HBO drama television series Vice Principals, for 14 episodes. From 2017 to 2019, she played Sydney Jones, the sister of Renée Felice Smith's character, in the drama series NCIS: Los Angeles. From 2018 to 2019, she played Huggins in the science fiction web series Red vs. Blue, for 13 episodes.

In 2021, Spillers succeeded Melanie Chartoff as the voice of Didi Pickles in the Paramount+ reboot television series Rugrats.

Personal life
In her interview for San Francisco News, she said: "I watched so many movies, and I was influenced by everyone I watched in a way. Every actor is so different, each bringing something unique to the table, so for a long time I don’t think I played favorites, I just soaked everything in, and went on that ride, along for the story they were telling. Judy Garland was someone I watched over and over, in The Wizard of Oz of course. And that woman was ahead of her time, I guess. Who am I to say that, but, I guess I mean, I watch her now, and her performances are so raw and human and real. I don’t know that I truly understood that as a kid, but I sure do now. She was special. I mean, A Star is Born? So good. Sigourney Weaver made an impression on me as Diane [sic] Fossey in Gorillas in the Mist. Her work in that is fierce, and she told Fossey’s story in a beautiful way. She also instilled in me, from such a tiny age, a real love of gorillas, and an interest and dedication to them remaining on this planet. That's something I think every actor aims to do through their work, make a difference somehow, and she did for me. And now I care very deeply for and have come to know the struggle of a species that otherwise I might have not."

Filmography

Film

Television

Video games

References

External links
 

American film actresses
American television actresses
American voice actresses
21st-century American actresses
Kempner High School alumni
Actresses from Texas
People from Houston
Living people
Year of birth missing (living people)